"Sharing Locations" is a song by American rapper Meek Mill, featuring fellow American rappers Lil Baby and Lil Durk. It was released on August 27, 2021, through Atlantic Records and Maybach Music Group, as the second single from Meek Mill's fifth studio album Expensive Pain. The song was produced by Nick Papz, KJ, Svdominik, and Xander. It is the second time that all artists are on the same song, following their joint collaboration, "Still Runnin", which appears on Baby and Durk's collaborative studio album, The Voice of the Heroes (2021).

Background
On January 28, 2021, Meek posted a snippet of the track on Instagram and revealed the involvement of Baby and Durk, while producer Papamitrou posted the same snippet. Video cinematographer Caleb Jermale posted a short clip of the song's accompanying music video. The song was originally thought to be "Bae Shit".

Critical reception
Writing for Vulture, Zoe Haylock stated that Meek, Baby, and Durk "trade bars back and forth like it a high-school parking lot over a Nick Papz, Xander, KJ, and Svdominik production".

Music video
A music video for the song, directed by Meek himself, was released alongside the song on August 27, 2021. It sees Meek, Baby, and Durk hanging out outside of a private jet and rapping.

Credits and personnel
Credits adapted from Tidal.

 Meek Mill – lead vocals, songwriting
 Lil Baby – featured vocals, songwriting
 Lil Durk – featured vocals, songwriting
 Nick Papz – production, songwriting, programming
 KJ – production, songwriting, programming
 Svdominik – production, songwriting, programming
 Xander – production, programming
 1995 – mixing, recording
 Damn James – mixing
 Jess Jackson – mastering

Charts

Weekly charts

Year-end charts

References

 

 

 
2021 singles
2021 songs
Meek Mill songs
Lil Baby songs
Lil Durk songs
Songs written by Meek Mill
Songs written by Lil Baby
Songs written by Lil Durk
Atlantic Records singles
Maybach Music Group singles
Trap music songs